Dorothea Buck (5 April 1917 – 9 October 2019) was a German writer and sculptor, diagnosed with schizophrenia at the age of 19. She was a victim of the Nazi dictatorship which forced her to be sterilized; she subsequently became an advocate for psychiatric reform.

Early life and education
Dorothea Buck was born in April 1917, the fourth of five children in Naumburg an der Saale, where she grew up.

In 1936, at the age of nineteen, she was diagnosed with schizophrenia at Bodelschwingh Foundation Bethel. There she was exposed to baths and cold water head pourings for "disciplining", then common practices of psychiatry in the first half of the 20th century. She found the "complete speechlessness" to be especially humiliating: patients did not speak to each other and conversations between staff and patients were unusual.

According to the "Law for the Prevention of Diseased Offspring" Buck was forcibly sterilized in the Bodelschwingh Foundation Bethel on 18 September 1936.

Career
After World War II, Buck began to work as a sculptor. From 1969 to 1982 she was a teacher of art and worked in Hamburg.

After her last treatment, in the early 1960s, Buck became an advocate for mental health, introducing an approach that gave value to patients' experiences.

She wrote an autobiography, published in 1990, under a pseudonym which was an anagram of "schizophrenia" in German, entitled "On the Trail of the Morning Star: Psychosis as Self-Discovery".

In 2011, she created the Dorothea Buck Foundation for mutual support of psychiatric patients.

Buck introduced an approach called "trialogue" with the head of the Special Outpatient Clinic for Psychosis at the University Medical Center Hamburg-Eppendorf and colleagues, which "gives equal weight to the experience of the mental health professional, the mental health service user, and the patient's family".
Buck pushed the German psychiatric profession to confront the role its members had played under the Nazi regime. The German Association for Psychiatry, Psychotherapy and Psychosomatics created a travelling exhibition about it.

Buck died in Hamburg in October 2019 at the age of 102. Alexandra Pohlmeier made a documentary film about her life: The sky and beyond – on the trail of Dorotea Buck.

Awards 
 Order of Merit of the Federal Republic of Germany – 2008
 Hamburg Senate recognition – 2017

References

External links 
 Dorothea Buck's English Homepage
 Dorothea Bucks Website
 
 
 
  Hauptvortrag beim Kongress „Coercive Treatment in Psychiatry: A Comprehensive Review“, veranstaltet von der World Psychiatric Association (WPA) in Dresden
 Dorothea Sophie Buck-Zerchin: "Seventy Years of Coercion in Psychiatric Institutions, Experienced and Witnessed", in: Peter Stastny & Peter Lehmann (eds.), Alternatives beyond psychiatry. Berlin / Eugene / Shrewsbury: Peter Lehmann Publishing 2007, pp. 19-28
  Dokumentation der Veranstaltung
Susanne Antonetta, "Remembering Dorothea Buck—Who Forced Psychiatry To Confront Its Deadly History" Ms Magazine (October 19, 2021).

1917 births
2019 deaths
German centenarians
German women writers
Women centenarians
Patient advocacy
Commanders Crosses of the Order of Merit of the Federal Republic of Germany